2014–15 Purple League was the Malaysia Purple League's first season. The Malaysia Purple League is a badminton league managed by Purple League (M) Sdn. Bhd. The Purple League is also known as the Kopiko Purple League for sponsorship reasons.

The League's inaugural season began on the 25 November 2014 and ended on 1 February 2015. Twelve teams participated in the league. The first leg ended on 2 January 2014 with Puchong United BC (Badminton Club) leading the table, and the season ended with Muar City BC becoming the first Malaysia Purple League Champion. Several Olympic gold medal winners, world champions, and former stars also participated in the inaugural season.

The team with the highest point score at the end of the season was awarded RM1,000,000 in prize money (about $237,000 in 2015 U.S. dollars). The second-place team received RM300,000, and the third place team received RM150,000. The fourth through tenth place teams each received RM80,000.

Format

The format differed from the usual for badminton tournaments. The 12 teams in the League played a round-robin competition using the best of five games format with 11 points per game. A tie would be decided by two men's singles, two men's doubles, one woman's singles, and one mixed doubles.

Player Registration

Each club could register up to 20 players, but they were only allowed to engage two players in the top 32 bracket. This was to ensure that the richer clubs did not have a monopoly on the best players. The clubs were also allowed to have foreign players on their teams, with the condition that these players should not constitute more than 30% of the team.

Teams

Note:
Yap Kim Hock is both the coach and manager for Klang United BC

Owners

Note:
 - Co-Owned

Squads 
A total of 12 clubs were chosen to compete in the league. Each squad has up to 20 players. Elite badminton players from all around the world also competed and represented different clubs.

-Kenichi Tago replaced Lee Chong Wei after he was suspended for failing a Dope Test at the 2014 BWF World Championships in Copenhagen

References

Malaysia Purple League
2014 in Malaysian sport
Badminton tournaments in Malaysia